Cedar Creek Township is the name of two townships in the U.S. state of Indiana:

 Cedar Creek Township, Allen County, Indiana
 Cedar Creek Township, Lake County, Indiana

See also
 Cedar Creek Township (disambiguation)

Indiana township disambiguation pages